The Monument to the Dead of World War II, also the Monument to the Brazilian Soldiers of World War II, commemorates Brazil's participation and losses in the Second World War (WWII). 

It is located in Flamengo Park (also known as Aterro do Flamengo and Parque Eduardo Gomes) on Guanabara Bay, in the Flamengo neighborhood of Rio de Janeiro, Brazil.

Features

Buildings
The below grade mausoleum holds the remains of 467 servicemen of the Brazilian Expeditionary Force who died in action in Italy during World War II. They were buried at the Brazilian Military Cemetery of Pistoia in Tuscany, Italy, until they were repatriated in 1960. The Tuscan site now honors the servicemen with the Brazilian Monument and Tomb of the Unknown Soldier of World War II, designed by Olavo Redig de Campos.

Long low stone peninsulas support rows of simple marble tablets of the fallen, in a serene minimalist manner.

An adjacent large space has permanent exhibits, films, and documentaries relating to the participation of Brazil in the European Theater of WWII, including images of personnel and equipment of the era.

A long  by  glass-bottomed fountain pool above the mausoleum allows natural light and cools the interior temperature.

Artworks
The "Monument to the Dead of World War II" was designed by architects Mark Netto Konder and Helio Ribas Marinho, the winners of a national competition. The monument construction was completed in 1960.  

Other artworks at the Monument include:
 the granite statue by Alfredo Ceschiatti – honoring the personnel of Brazil's land, sea, and air forces.
 the metal abstract sculpture by Júlio Catelli Filho – honoring the Brazilian Air Force.
 the tile mosaic wall mural (1959) by Anisio Medeiros – honoring those of both the navy and merchant marine who died at sea.

Flamengo Park – adjacent
 Carmen Miranda Museum
 Marina da Glória
 Rio de Janeiro Museum of Modern Art – Museu de Arte Moderna (MAM)

See also

 Brazilian Military Cemetery of Pistoia – "Brazilian Monument and Tomb of the Unknown Soldier of World War II" in Italy.
 Brazil in World War II
 Monuments and memorials in Brazil
 Modernist architecture in Brazil

References

Brazil in World War II
Mausoleums in Brazil
Monuments and memorials in Rio de Janeiro (city)
World War II memorials
World War II cemeteries
Modernist architecture in Brazil
National heritage sites of Rio de Janeiro (state)